Seyf ol Din (also Romanized as Seyf ol Dīn and Seyf od Dīn; also known as Seyfed Dīn) is a village in Gughar Rural District, in the Central District of Baft County, Kerman Province, Iran. At the 2006 census, its population was 31, in 9 families.

References 

Populated places in Baft County